Argentina participated at the Olympic Games for the first time in 1900. It has participated at all subsequent Summer Olympics except in 1904, 1912, and the nation boycotted the Moscow Olympics due to its support for the United States, in 1980. It participated at the Winter Olympics in 1928, 1948, 1952 and continuously since 1960.

Argentina was one of the 12 countries – the only from Ibero-America – who founded the International Olympic Committee (IOC) in 1894, being represented by the first Executive Council José Benjamín Zubiaur, who served in that role until 1907. The National Olympic Committee for Argentina was created and recognized in 1923. The country had successful performances during the period 1924-1952, claiming at least one gold medal in every edition. 

Starting with the 1956 Summer Olympics, Argentina suffered a gradual overall decline, a situation that reached its most critical point in the 1976 and 1984 Summer Olympics. In those Games, Argentina did not win any medals. At the 2004 Summer Olympics in Athens, the country claimed gold medals for the first time after 52 years. 2004 also marked the point where Argentina was surpassed by neighbor Brazil as the South American country with most golds and total medals. The Olympics hosted by Brazil in 2016 had the biggest Argentinian delegation, 213 athletes, and the country won 3 gold medals for the first time since 1948, including the first by a woman. 

Argentine athletes have won a total of 77 medals at the Summer Olympic Games. 24 of these medals have come in boxing, Argentina has won more medals in this sport than in any other. The nation has not won yet any medals at the Winter Olympic Games.

Buenos Aires hosted the 2018 Summer Youth Olympics.

Medal tables 

Highlighted in bold indicates all-time best results

Medals by Summer Games

Medals by Winter Games

Medals by Summer Sport

Medals by gender

List of medalists

Youth Games medal tables

Medals by Summer Youth Games

Medals by Winter Youth Games

Medals by Summer Youth Sport

Summary by sport

Fencing

Argentina's Olympic debut in 1900 consisted of a single fencer, Francisco Camet, who placed fifth (among a field of over 100 fencers) in the men's épée.

Sailing

See also 
 List of flag bearers for Argentina at the Olympics
 Argentina at the Paralympics

References

External links
 
 
 
 "Argentine gold medals won at Olympic Games", Xinhua, July 9, 2008